Hilary Halba (born ca 1962) is a New Zealand actor, theatre director and academic. She is the head of the performing arts programme at the University of Otago.

Biography 
Halba was born in Milton and attended Tokomairiro High School before studying at the University of Otago.

Halba studied acting and the teaching of acting at the Neighborhood Playhouse School of the Theater in New York City, and is an accredited teacher of the Meisner Technique. She was a founding member of theatre collectives Kilimogo Productions and Wow! Productions Trust.

In 2010 she collaborated with Stuart Young to research and create a verbatim theatre production telling stories of domestic violence.

Recognition 
Halba won Best Female Performer in the 2012 Dunedin Theatre Awards, and was named Dunedin's best actor of 2003 by the New Zealand Listener.

Theatre and television work

Theatre

Television

Film

References

External links 
 

Living people
Academic staff of the University of Otago
Year of birth missing (living people)
1960s births
New Zealand theatre directors
New Zealand women academics
Neighborhood Playhouse School of the Theatre alumni
People from Milton, New Zealand
People educated at Tokomairiro High School